Erick Fornaris Álvarez (born January 2, 1979, in Havana) is a male diver from Cuba. He represented his native country at three consecutive Summer Olympics, starting in 2000 (Sydney, Australia). Fornaris won two silver medals at the 2007 Pan American Games in Rio de Janeiro, Brazil.

References
 
 

1979 births
Living people
Sportspeople from Havana
Cuban male divers
Olympic divers of Cuba
Divers at the 2000 Summer Olympics
Divers at the 2004 Summer Olympics
Divers at the 2007 Pan American Games
Divers at the 2008 Summer Olympics
Pan American Games silver medalists for Cuba
Pan American Games medalists in diving
Divers at the 2003 Pan American Games
Central American and Caribbean Games gold medalists for Cuba
Universiade medalists in diving
Competitors at the 2006 Central American and Caribbean Games
Universiade bronze medalists for Cuba
Central American and Caribbean Games medalists in diving
Medalists at the 2001 Summer Universiade
Medalists at the 2005 Summer Universiade
Medalists at the 2003 Pan American Games
Medalists at the 2007 Pan American Games
21st-century Cuban people